Passin' Thru is an album by American jazz drummer Chico Hamilton featuring performances recorded in September 1962 and released in February 1963 on the Impulse! label.

Reception

The Allmusic review by Scott Yanow awarded the album 4½ stars, with Scott Yanow's review stating: "Drummer Chico Hamilton's debut on Impulse featured his fifth Quintet, an advanced hard bop unit that sometimes hinted a little at the avant-garde... this was a major band".

Track listing
All compositions by Charles Lloyd except as noted
 "Passin' Thru" – 8:16
 "The Second Time Around" (Sammy Cahn, Jimmy Van Heusen) – 3:11
 "El Toro" (Chico Hamilton, Charles Lloyd, Gabor Szabo) – 4:39
 "Transfusion" – 2:42
 "Lady Gabor" (Gábor Szabó) – 13:15
 "Lonesome Child" – 5:41
Recorded at Rudy Van Gelder Studio in Englewood Cliffs, New Jersey, on September 18, 1962 (tracks 1-4), and September 20, 1962 (tracks 5 & 6)

Personnel
Chico Hamilton – drums
George Bohanon – trombone; percussion (3)
Charles Lloyd – tenor saxophone (1,2,4,6), flute (3,5)
Gábor Szabó – guitar
Albert Stinson – bass

References 

1963 albums
Chico Hamilton albums
Impulse! Records albums
Albums recorded at Van Gelder Studio
Albums produced by Bob Thiele